New Hampshire Route 13 is a  long north–south state highway in the state of New Hampshire, United States. The highway runs from Brookline to Concord.

The southern terminus is at the Massachusetts state line in Brookline, where the route continues south as Massachusetts Route 13. The northern terminus is in the center of Concord at U.S. Route 202 and New Hampshire Route 9, locally the intersection of South Street and Pleasant Street.

Route description

Brookline to Milford 
NH 13 begins as a continuation of Massachusetts Route 13 at the state line between Brookline and Townsend, Massachusetts.  It continues north for about  through Brookline and crosses into Milford, where it meets an interchange with New Hampshire Route 101.  The highway continues north for about  through the outskirts of Milford's urban center until it reaches Union Square, better known as the Milford Oval, where it intersects New Hampshire Route 101A.

Mont Vernon to Goffstown 
NH 13 continues north over the Souhegan River on the Colonel John Shepard Bridge, then turns northwest for  towards Mont Vernon and serves as the town's main road.  After intersecting the Francestown Turnpike in the center of Mont Vernon, NH 13 continues northwest for about  until it intersects New Hampshire Route 136 in the center of New Boston.  The highway then turns east, crossing the South Branch Piscataquog River, then goes northeast for  along the path of the river toward Goffstown.  It turns north at the intersection of New Hampshire Route 114 with which it briefly runs concurrently over the Piscataquog River and into downtown Goffstown.

Dunbarton to Concord 
After taking a sharp right at the intersection, NH 13 heads northeast towards Concord for  until it reaches the interchange with Interstate 89 near a New Hampshire State Police barracks. NH 13 then turns north on South Street near downtown Concord, where it meets its northern terminus at US 202/NH 9.

Junction list

References

External links

 New Hampshire State Route 13 on Flickr

013
Transportation in Hillsborough County, New Hampshire
Transportation in Merrimack County, New Hampshire